William Norton, 2nd Baron Grantley (19 February 1742 – 12 November 1822) was a British politician who sat in the House of Commons from 1768 to 1789 when he succeeded to the peerage as Baron Grantley.

Norton was the son of Fletcher Norton, 1st Baron Grantley, who was created a peer on 9 April 1782, from which time William Norton was styled 'the Honourable'.  He was educated at St John's College, Cambridge.

Norton was Member of Parliament for Richmond 1768–1774, for Wigtown Burghs 1774–1775 (unseated on petition), Richmond 1775–1780, Guildford 1782–1784 and Surrey 1784–1789. He became the 2nd Lord Grantley on 1 January 1789.

He was the third Englishman to be elected and the second to actually sit in Parliament, for the Scottish constituency of Wigtown Burghs.

Arms

References

History of Parliament: House of Commons 1754-1790, by Sir Lewis Namier and James Brooke (Sidgwick & Jackson 1964)

External links
 
 2nd Lord Grantley
 

1742 births
1822 deaths
Members of the Parliament of Great Britain for English constituencies
Members of the Parliament of Great Britain for Scottish constituencies
Alumni of St John's College, Cambridge
British MPs 1768–1774
British MPs 1774–1780
British MPs 1780–1784
British MPs 1784–1790
William